Galatz may refer to:

 Alternative spelling for Galați, a town in Romania
 Galil Tzalafim, a sniper version of the Israeli IMI Galil assault rifle
 Galey Tzahal, an abbreviation of the Israel Army Radio network
 Galgalatz